The 74th Texas Legislature met from January 10, 1995, to May 29, 1995. All members present during this session were elected in the 1994 general elections.

Sessions

Regular Session: January 10, 1995 - May 29, 1995

Party summary

Senate

House

Officers

Senate
 Lieutenant Governor: Bob Bullock, Democrat
 President Pro Tempore: Gonzalo Barrientos, Democrat

House
 Speaker of the House: Pete Laney, Democrat

Members

Senate

House

External links

74th Texas Legislature
1995 in Texas
1995 U.S. legislative sessions